Radcliffe railway station (also known as Radcliffe-on-Trent and Radcliffe (Notts)) serves the village of Radcliffe-on-Trent in Nottinghamshire, England. Services run to Nottingham, Grantham, Boston and Skegness.

History
It is located on the line first opened by the Ambergate, Nottingham, Boston and Eastern Junction Railway on 15 July 1850 and taken over by the Great Northern Railway

The station itself was opened by the Great Northern Railway. The station buildings were designed by Thomas Chambers Hine.

The Great Northern and London and North Western Joint Railway opened in 1879 from Saxondale Junction, a few miles east of the station. The London and North Western Railway then provided a Nottingham to Northampton service which ceased in 1953.

From 7 January 1963 passenger steam trains between Grantham, Bottesford, Elton and Orston, Aslockton, Bingham, Radcliffe-on-Trent, Netherfield and Colwick, Nottingham London-road (High Level) and Nottingham (Victoria) were replaced with diesel-multiple unit trains. 

The station was renamed from Radcliffe on Trent to Radcliffe on 6 May 1974.

Services 

All services are provided by East Midlands Railway, usually using  or  units.

References

External links

Railway stations in Nottinghamshire
DfT Category F1 stations
Former Great Northern Railway stations
Railway stations in Great Britain opened in 1850
Railway stations served by East Midlands Railway
Thomas Chambers Hine railway stations
Radcliffe on Trent